The 2022 Maryland Terrapins men's soccer team represented the University of Maryland, College Park in the 2022 NCAA Division I men's soccer season. It was the 77th season of university fielding a program. Maryland finished the regular season with a 9–2–5 record, winning the Big Ten Conference. The Terrapins finished the season ranked No. 17/21.

Schedule 
Source

Exhibition matches

Regular season

Big Ten tournament

NCAA tournament

References

See also 

 Maryland Terrapins

Maryland Terrapins men's soccer seasons
Maryland Terrapins
Maryland Terrapins
Maryland Terrapins
Maryland